No Brand Con is an annual three-day anime convention held during spring at the Chula Vista Resort in Wisconsin Dells, Wisconsin. The convention was founded by members of the University of Wisconsin–Eau Claire Anime Appreciation Society. No Brand Con's name was derived from the closing credits theme of the anime Here Is Greenwood.

Programming
No Brand Con features anime viewings, an anime music video contest, artist alley, board games, comics, dealers room, independent films, panels, role playing, video games tournaments, and voice actor appearances.

History
In 2005 the convention moved to the Plaza Hotel and Suites, which allowed for food sales, and the convention to run for a full 24 hours. From 2006 to 2010 the convention was located at the Ramada Inn Convention Center, until returning to the Plaza Hotel and Suites for 2011. In 2011, the convention brought around $277,000 to the economy of Eau Claire, and held a benefit for the Japanese Red Cross. In 2016, the event relocated from Eau Claire to the Chula Vista Resort in Wisconsin Dells, WI. No Brand Con 2020 was moved from April to August due to the COVID-19 pandemic, but was later cancelled. No Brand Con 2021 was cancelled due to the COVID-19 pandemic.

Event history

References

External links
 No Brand Con Website

Anime conventions in the United States
Recurring events established in 2002
2002 establishments in Wisconsin
Annual events in Wisconsin
Festivals in Wisconsin
Organizations based in Wisconsin
Tourist attractions in Adams County, Wisconsin
Conventions in Wisconsin